James  C.  "Jim"  Frishe (born April 6, 1949, Potsdam, New York) was an American politician. Frishe is a Representative in the House of Representatives of the U.S. state of Florida. He received his bachelor's degree from the University of Florida in 1971. He lives in St. Petersburg, Florida with his family.

References

External links
Official Website of Representative James Frishe

University of Florida alumni
Republican Party members of the Florida House of Representatives
1949 births
Living people